Siti is an Indonesian and Malay female given name. It is of Arabic/Swahili/Egyptian origin. Notable people with this name include:

 Siti Adiyati, Indonesian artist
 Siti Aishah Shaik Ismail, Malaysian politician
 Siti Aisyah Alias, Malaysian marine researcher
 Siti Aisyah We Tenriolle
 Siti Ashah Ghazali, Malaysian politician
 Siti Badriah (born 1991), Indonesian singer
 Siti Berenee Yahaya, Malaysian politician
 Siti Chamamah Soeratno, Indonesian scholar
 Siti Fadia Silva Ramadhanti (born 2000), Indonesian badminton player
 Siti Fadilah Supari (born 1949), Indonesian politician
 Siti Hardiyanti Rukmana (born 1949), Indonesian politician
 Siti Hartati Murdaya (born 1946), Indonesian criminal
 Siti Hartinah, Indonesian first lady
 Siti Hasmah Mohamad Ali (born 1926)
 Siti Kamaluddin
 Siti Mariah Mahmud (born 1958), Malaysian politician
 Siti Masitha Soeparno, Indonesian businesswoman and politician
 Siti Munirah Jusoh
 Siti Musdah Mulia (born 1958), Indonesian women's right activist
 Siti Noor Halimi Hussain (born 1984), Malaysian futsal player
 Siti Noor Iasah Mohamad Ariffin (born 1989), Malaysian paralympic athlete
 Siti Noor Radiah Ismail (born 1993), Malaysian paralympian
 Siti Noordjannah Djohantini
 Siti Nordiana (born 1984), Malaysian celebrity
 Siti Norma Yaakob (born 1940), Malaysian judge
 Siti Nur Adibah Akma Mohd Fuad (born 1999), Malaysian cyclist
 Siti Nurbaya Bakar (born 1956), Indonesian politician
 Siti Nurhaliza
 Siti Oetari
 Siti Qomariyah (born 1967) , Indonesian politician
 Siti Rahmah Kassim (1926–2017)
 Siti Ruhani (born 1987), Malaysian hockey player
 Siti Rukiah (1927–1996), Indonesian author
 Siti binti Saad (1880–1950), Tanzanian singer
 Siti Safiyah, Malaysian ten-pin bowler
 Siti Saleha (born 1990), Malaysian actress and model
 Siti Sarah (1984–2021), Malaysian singer and actress
 Siti Wan Kembang
 Siti Zaharah Sulaiman, Malaysian politician
 Siti Zailah Mohd Yusoff (born 1963), Malaysian politician
 Siti Zainon Ismail (born 1949), Malaysian author
 Siti Zalina Ahmad (born 1979), Malaysian lawn bowler